Mezzano (Međàn in local dialect) is a comune (municipality) in Trentino in the northern Italian region Trentino-Alto Adige/Südtirol, located about  east of Trento.

Mezzano borders the following municipalities: Siror, Canal San Bovo, Cesiomaggiore, Imer, Feltre, Sovramonte and Transacqua.

Demographic evolution

References

External links
 Homepage of the city

Cities and towns in Trentino-Alto Adige/Südtirol